Alireza Kazeminejad (born 7 February 1994) is an Iranian weightlifter who won a gold medal at the 2010 Youth Olympic Games in Singapore.

Major results

References

External links
 
 

1994 births
Living people
Iranian male weightlifters
Weightlifters at the 2010 Summer Youth Olympics
Place of birth missing (living people)
Youth Olympic gold medalists for Iran
21st-century Iranian people